Synkronized is the fourth studio album by English funk and acid jazz band Jamiroquai. It was released on 8 June 1999 by Work Group in the United States, and on 14 June 1999 by S2 Records in the United Kingdom. While the group recorded the album, bassist Stuart Zender left Jamiroquai, and Nick Fyffe was hired as a replacement. The album contains funk, acid jazz and disco elements. 

The album reached number one in the UK Albums Chart and number 28 in the US Billboard 200. The UK version of the album includes the bonus track "Deeper Underground", which was released as a single the previous year and became Jamiroquai's only number-one single in the UK.

Album information

The album's recording sessions began at Jay Kay's Buckinghamshire home studio, Chillington, in 1998. About 9 tracks were recorded, but the band's bassist, Stuart Zender, left partway through the recording in late 1998. Jay Kay hired a replacement, Nick Fyffe, and the album was re-recorded. The revised album was finished and released within 6 months. Synkronized is the band's last album to feature didgeridoo player Wallis Buchanan.

The opening track, "Canned Heat", has "svelte Chic Organisation strings, a percolating bassline and a stomping four-on-the-floor rhythm". The second track, "Planet Home", is a "straight, bass-driven funk" track that has techno influences from "ghostly ambient harmonies to bone-shaking synth bass," and an "out-of-nowhere Latin hustle breakdown". The next track, "Black Capricorn Day", has a "driving funk groove with sassy horn interjections" which tend to "stutte[r] like a record on a turntable", with its lyrics about being depressed.  "Falling" is a "bass driven" acid-jazz ballad track, which is followed by "Destitute Illusion", an instrumental track "swamped in layer upon layer of antique analogue synthesizers", and has the "scratching of DJ D-Zire".

The seventh track, "Supersonic", has a "didgeridoo and dobro drone against electronic percussion and a squiggling synth bass, all of which builds to an hallucinogenic mid-song samba break." The "breezy" track "Butterfly" has "a wobbly bassline that rises up and swamps the chorus." "Where Do We Go from Here?" was described  as the point of change within the group's sound, using rocks with a leap-frogging blues piano and tangy bongos. The final song on the album, "King for a Day", has "dramatic piano and sympathetic strings", with its lyrics referencing Zender's departure.

Release
Synkronized was first released on 8 June 1999 on the Work Group label in the United States, then on 14 June in the United Kingdom on Sony Soho Square. The album reached number 28 in the US Billboard 200, where it sold 310,000 shipments. The album peaked at number 2 in the UK chart. In Japan, it reached number 2, and in the year end charts there it ranked number 32 in 1999. It peaked at number 2 in the French SNEP Album charts and number 30 in the year end chart in 1999. In Switzerland, it reached number 2 in the Swiss Albums Charts, and number 25 in the year end chart in 1999. It ranked number 1 in the German Media Control Albums Chart, and it ranked at number 23 in the German year end charts. In Belgium, it ranked 4 in the Ultratop Flanders chart and nymber 6 in the Wallonia chart. In their year end charts, the album ranked at 42 and 36 respectively. In the Netherlands, in peaked at 6 in the album chart, and number 50 in the year end chart in 1999. In the Australian ARIA Albums chart, it ranked at 1 and 63 at the end of the year. The album was certified platinum in the UK, Switzerland and France. In Japan, it had a quadruple platinum certification. The album was certified gold in Germany, Belgium, the Netherlands, and Australia. It was Platinum in Europe by the IFPI denoting sales of 1,000,000 copies. The album overall sold 3,000,000 copies worldwide.

"Deeper Underground" was the first single to be released on 13 July 1998, where it topped the UK Singles Chart. It remains as their only single to do so. "Canned Heat" was released on 24 May 1999 and was the group's second number one on the US Billboard Dance Club Songs Chart. It also ranked at number 4 in the UK. "Supersonic", released 13 September 1999, is the group's third US Dance Club number 1, also ranking at number 22 in the UK. "King For A Day" is the last song to be released, where it peaked at number 20 in the UK.

Reception

The album received positive reviews from critics. Tony Farsides of The Guardian remarked that Synkronizeds "hard and nervy uptempo disco feel reflects the frantic atmosphere surrounding its creation." Farsides called it "Jamiroquai's best record to date. It is more consistent than its three predecessors. The new album's key innovation occurs sonically, with the addition of a harder digital edge to Jamiroquai's trusty jazz-funk." Rolling Stone gave the album 3 out of five stars, claiming "Synkronized is fifty minutes of sleek, sexy fun; a party album delivered with something like conviction. It's not exactly irresistible, but, really, what's the point of resisting it?" Spin gave the album the same rating, claiming "...redirects the band's British tendency toward smoothed-out old black jams....soaring strings, gyrating congas, hell-bent wah-wah's, and an undeniably live rhythm section that'll hustle your muscles and make you freak to the beat..." Entertainment Weekly claimed "Imagine if [Stevie] Wonder had made a disco album in 1977!....Synkronized is a hat trick done with the sharpest chapeau in the store." College Music Journal claimed "This incessantly upbeat expedition travels into the regions of Travolta-era disco...feverish funk...and instrumental iridescence...keeping your ears tuned to their funktastic audio adventures." Q magazine claimed the album was one of the "50 Best Albums of 1999".

Prasad Bidaye of Exclaim! called the album, "Jamiroquai's most sophisticated production… The songs don't come anywhere close to the smooth balance of funk and environmentalism in their earlier material, but their philosophy of pre-millennial escapism makes this one of the most energetic recordings Jamiroquai has released in years."  Edna Gundersen of USA Today wrote that "while the band's fourth album does boast a few jamming grooves, especially the brassy Black Capricorn Day, most of the tracks are to funk what Pop Tarts are to soul food." Writing for Las Vegas Review-Journal, Tom Moon wrote that "the liquid, slippery grooves are paramount, though they're sometimes buried under mountains of strings and arrangements that are a tad too busy. He also said that "Canned Heat" and several other tracks are thinly veiled rewrites of "Virtual Insanity" and the other radio songs from Traveling Without Moving." In his consumer guide for The Village Voice, critic Robert Christgau gave the album a C− rating in his annual "Turkey Shoot", indicating "a bad record of some general import".

Kay said in a 2001 Billboard interview that he was dissatisfied with Synkronized, "I never really locked into that album, lyrically. I wasn't there. I listen to it now, and I shake my head."

Track listing

Personnel
Credits for Synkronized adapted from album liner notes.JamiroquaiJay Kay – vocals, arrangements, string arrangements, producer, artwork concept
Toby Smith – keyboards, keyboard programming (tracks 1–9)
Derrick McKenzie – drums
Nick Fyffe – bass
Simon Katz – guitar (except track 1)
Sola Akingbola – percussion
Wallis Buchanan – didgeridoo
DJ D-Zire – turntablesAdditional musiciansIrwin Kelles – guitar (track 1)
Katie Kissoon & Beverley Skeet – backing vocals
Kick Horns – horns
Simon Hale – string arrangements, keyboard programming (track 10)Production'
Al Stone – producer, recording, mixing
Paul Stoney – assistant engineering
Mike Marsh – mastering
David Malone – artwork concept
Midori Tsukagoshi – photography

Charts

Weekly charts

Year-end charts

Certifications and sales

References

External links
 

1999 albums
Jamiroquai albums